The history of Chinese currency spans more than 3000 years. Currency of some type has been used in China since the Neolithic age which can be traced back to between 3000 and 4500 years ago. Cowry shells are believed to have been the earliest form of currency used in Central China, and were used during the Neolithic period.

Around 210 BC, the first emperor of China Qin Shi Huang (260–210 BC) abolished all other forms of local currency and introduced a uniform copper coin. Paper money was invented in China in the 7th century, but the base unit of currency remained the copper coin. Copper coins were used as the chief denomination of currency in China until the introduction of the yuan.

Currently, the renminbi is the official currency of the People's Republic of China (PRC). It is the legal tender in mainland China, but not in Hong Kong or Macau. The special administrative regions of Hong Kong and Macau use the Hong Kong dollar and the Macanese pataca, respectively. In the Republic of China (ROC), the New Taiwan dollar is the official legal tender in Taiwan since 2000.

Ancient currencies 

The use of shell money is attested to in the Chinese writing system. The traditional characters for 'goods', 'buy/sell', and 'monger', in addition to various other words relating to 'exchange', all contain the radical , which is the pictograph for shell (simplified to ). The extent of the circulation of shell money is unknown, and barter trade may have been common. However, copies of cowry shells made out of bone, wood, stone, lead and copper were common enough to presume that they were used in trade.

The Chinese may have invented the first metal coins, coins found in Anyang date to before 900 BC. At that time, the coin itself was a mock of more earlier used cowry shells, so it was called the Bronze shell.

Bronzed shells were found in the ruins of Yin, the old capital of the Shang dynasty (1500–1046 BC). Bronze became the universal currency during the succeeding Zhou dynasty. During the Warring States period, from the 5th century BC to 221 BC, Chinese money was in the form of bronze objects that were of three main types. The Zhou, the Wei, the Han and the Qin all used coins shaped like a spade (bu). The Qi used money in the shape of a knife (dao). The Zhao and the Yan used knife money before switching over to spade money roughly halfway through the Warring States period. The Chu used money in the forms of "ant nose" coins (yibi).

Unification 

As part of the Unification of China, Qin Shi Huang (260 BC – 210 BC) introduced a uniform copper coin with the inscription "Ban Liang" based on the coins previously used by Qin. All other forms of local currency were abolished. The coins were round with a square hole in the middle which was the common design for most Chinese copper coins until the 20th century. Due to the low value of an individual coin, the Chinese have traditionally strung a nominal thousand copper coins onto a piece of string. Government taxes were levied on both coins and products such as rolls of silk. Salaries were paid in "stones" (dàn) of grain during the Qin and Han dynasties.

Tang 
Tang merchants rapidly adopted forms of paper currency starting with promissory notes in Sichuan called "flying money" (feiqian). These proved so useful the state took over production of this form of paper money with the first state-backed printing in 1024. By the 12th century, various forms of paper money had become the dominant forms of currency in China and were known by a variety of names such as jiaozi, huizi, kuaizi, or guanzi.

Song 
 
During the early Song dynasty (Chinese: , 960–1279), China again reunited the currency system displacing coinages from ten or so independent states. Among pre-Song coins, the northern states tended to prefer copper coins. The southern states tended to use lead or iron coins with Sichuan with its own heavy iron coins which continued to circulate for a short period into the Song dynasty. By 1000 CE, unification (south of the Liao) was complete and China experienced a period of rapid economic growth. This was reflected in the growth of coining. In 1073—the peak year for minting coins in the Northern Song—the government produced an estimated six million strings containing a thousand copper coins each. The Northern Song is thought to have minted over two hundred million strings of coins which were often exported to Inner Asia, Japan, and South-East Asia, where they often formed the dominant form of coinage.

Yuan 

The Mongol-founded Yuan dynasty (Chinese: , 1271–1368) also attempted to use paper currency. Unlike the Tang dynasty, they created a unified, national system that was not backed by silver or gold. The currency issued by the Yuan was the world's first fiat currency, known as Jiaochao. The Yuan government attempted to prohibit all transactions in or possession of silver or gold, which had to be turned over to the government. Inflation in 1260 caused the government to replace the existing paper currency with a new one in 1287, but inflation that resulted from undisciplined printing remained a problem for the Yuan court until the end of the Yuan dynasty.

Ming 

The early Ming dynasty (1368–1644) also attempted to use paper currency in the early re-unification period. This currency also experienced rapid inflation and issues were suspended in 1450 although notes remained in circulation until 1573. It was only in the very last years of the Ming dynasty when Li Zicheng threatened Beijing in 1643 and 1645 that printing took place again. For most of the Ming China had a purely private system of currency for all important transactions. Silver, which flowed in from overseas, began to be used as a currency in the Far South province of Guangdong where it spread to the lower Yangtze region by 1423 when it became legal tender for payment of taxes. Provincial taxes had to be remitted to the capital in silver after 1465, salt producers had to pay in silver from 1475 and corvée exemptions had to be paid in silver from 1485. The Chinese demand for silver was met by traditional maritime silk road trade links, from either Quanzhou, Zhangzhou, Guangzhou, or Macau, with Manila in the Philippines as part of the Spanish East Indies who traded Philippine peso (Spanish silver dollars) for chinaware and other trade goods, after the Spanish colonial empire became established at Manila in 1571. The Spanish silver dollar were minted and mined from the Spanish Americas, in particular Potosí in Peru and Mexico. The trade of Spanish silver dollars with chinaware and other trade goods flowed through the Manila-Acapulco Galleon Trade from the Philippines to Mexico and vice versa within the Spanish colonial empire. It circulated as minted Spanish dollars sometimes stamped with Chinese characters known as "chop marks" which indicated that they were verified by a merchant and determined to be genuine. Spanish silver also circulated as ingots (known as sycee or yuanbao) which weighed a nominal liang (about 36 grams) although purity and weight varied from region to region. The liang was often referred to by Europeans by the Malay term tael. The first Chinese yuan coins had the same specification as a Spanish dollar, leading to a continuing equivalence in some respects between the names "yuan" and "dollar" in the Chinese language.

Qing 
 

Late Imperial China maintained both a silver and a copper currency system. The copper system was based on the copper cash (wen). The silver system had several units which by the Qing dynasty were: 1 tael = 10 mace = 100 candareens = 1000 lí (silver cash).

In 1889, the Chinese yuan was introduced at par with the Spanish dollar or Mexican peso or Philippine peso and was subdivided into 10 jiao (not given an English name, cf. dime), 100 fen (cents), and 1000 wen (cash). The yuan was equivalent to 7 mace and 2 candareens (or 0.72 tael) and, for a time, coins were marked as such in English.

The earliest issues were silver coins produced at the Kwangtung mint in denominations of 5 fen, 1, 2 and 5 jiao and 1 yuan. Other regional mints were opened in the 1890s producing similar coins. Copper coins in denominations of 1, 2, 5, 10 and 20 wen were also issued. The central government began issuing its own coins in the yuan currency system in 1903. Banknotes were issued in yuan denominations from the 1890s by several local and private banks, along with the "Imperial Bank of China" and the "Hu Pu Bank" (later the "Ta-Ch'ing Government Bank"), established by the imperial government.

Republic of China

Silver coins 
The Republic of China was founded after the Xinhai Revolution toppled the Qing dynasty. The Nanjing-based Provisional Government of the Republic of China urgently needed to issue military currency for use in place of the previous Qing currency. Successively, each province declared independence from the Qing and issued their own military currency. In 1914, the National Currency Ordinance established the silver dollar as the national currency of the Republic of China. Although designs changed compared with imperial era coins, the sizes and metals used in the coinage remained mostly unchanged until the 1930s. The majority of regional mints closed during the 1920s and 1930s, although some continued until 1949. From 1936, the central government issued copper , 1 and 2 fen coins, nickel (later cupronickel) 5, 10 and 20 fen and  yuan coins. Aluminium 1 and 5 fen pieces were issued in 1940.

The 1920s and 1930s saw the price of silver appreciate in the international market, increasing the purchasing power of the Chinese currency and leading to a massive efflux of silver out of China. It became evident to the Chinese government that it could not retain the Silver Standard without debt defaults increasing, and so chose to abandon it. The situation was exacerbated by the multitude of commercial, provincial and foreign banks issuing currencies all at different values.

Fabi 
In 1935, the Central Government enacted currency reforms to limit currency issuance to four major government controlled banks: the Bank of China, Central Bank of China, Bank of Communications and later the Farmers Bank of China. The circulation of silver dollar coins was prohibited, and private ownership of silver was banned. A new currency issued in its place was known as fabi, literally "legal tender".

Customs gold units 

Customs gold units (pinyin: guānjīnyuán) were issued by the Central Bank of China to facilitate payment of duties on imported goods. Unlike the national currency which suffered from hyperinflation, the CGUs were pegged to the U.S. dollar at 1 CGU = US$0.40.

Unfortunately, the peg was removed in 1935 and the bank allowed CGUs to be released for general use. Already awash with excessive paper currency, the CGUs only added to rampant hyperinflation.

1945–1948 
After the defeat of Japan in 1945, the Central Bank of China issued a separate currency in the northeast to replace those issued by puppet banks. Termed "" (pinyin: Dōngběi jiǔ shěng liútōngquàn), it was worth approximately 10 times more than fabi circulating elsewhere. It was replaced in 1948 by the gold yuan. The Northeastern Provinces yuan was an attempt to isolate certain regions of China from the hyperinflation that plagued the fabi currency.

Gold yuan 
The onset of World War II saw a sharp devaluation of the fabi currency. This was largely due to the unrestrained issuance of the currency to fund the war effort. After the defeat of Japan and the return of the Kuomintang Central Government, a further reform was instituted in August 1948 in response to hyperinflation. The Gold Yuan Certificate replaced the fabi at the rate of 1 gold yuan = 3 million yuan fabi = US$0.25. However, the currency was never actually backed by gold and hyperinflation continued.

1949–2001 
Finally, in 1949, the Kuomintang again announced a reform with the introduction of the Silver Yuan Certificate, returning China to the silver standard. The silver yuan would be exchanged at 1 silver yuan = 100 million gold yuan, and was backed by silver dollars minted by the Central Mint of China.

This currency was short-lived, as the Chinese Communist Party soon gained control of the Mainland provinces. It was replaced by currency issued by the People's Bank of China which was less prone to inflation.

After the retreat of the Kuomintang to Taiwan, the silver yuan remained the de jure legal currency of account of the Republic of China, although only Taiwan dollars issued by the Bank of Taiwan were circulating in areas controlled by the ROC. After a currency reform in 1949 created the New Taiwan dollar, the statutory exchange rate was set at 1 silver yuan = NT$3.

An amendment was passed in 2000 to make the New Taiwan dollar the official legal currency of the Republic of China.

Taiwan dollar 

The Bank of Taiwan was originally established by the Japanese in 1899 whilst Taiwan was under Japanese administration. The bank issued Taiwanese yen which were pegged to the Japanese yen. After the retrocession of Taiwan to the Republic of China, the new Bank of Taiwan was allowed to continue issuing its own currency. Called the "Taiwan dollar", it replaced the Taiwanese yen at par. This was an attempt by the Kuomintang to prevent the hyperinflation affecting the mainland from affecting Taiwan.

However, mismanagement by the governor-general Chen Yi meant that the Taiwan dollar also suffered depreciation. It was replaced by the New Taiwan dollar in 1949 at the rate of 40,000 to 1.

Japanese occupation money 
The Japanese Imperial Government issued currency through several means during their occupation of China.

Manchuria 
At the time of invasion of China's northeast in 1931, multiple currencies were circulating. These included local provincial issues, the Kuomintang fabi and yen currencies issued by the Bank of Chosen and the Bank of Taiwan.

After the puppet state of Manchukuo was created, the Japanese founded the Central Bank of Manchou on July 1, 1932, in Changchun, then known as Hsinking. While the bank provided commercial functions, it also acted as a central bank and issuer of currency. The Manchukuo yuan was initially set at 1 Manchukuo yuan = 23.91 g silver, but became pegged to the Japanese yen at 1:1 in 1935 after Japan left the gold standard. The currency lasted until the end of World War II. It was replaced by the Northeastern Provinces Yuan issued by the Central Bank of China.

Inner Mongolia 

Before Japanese occupation, the predominant bank of China's northern provinces (including Suiyuan, Chahar and Shanxi) was the Charhar Commercial Bank. When the Japanese invaded, the bank evacuated the area taking all of its capital and all unissued currency. The Japanese military government quickly established the Channan Commercial Bank to replace its note issuing functions.

With the formation of Mengjiang puppet state, the authorities established the Bank of Mengjiang which amalgamated the Channan Commercial Bank with three other smaller regional banks. The Bank of Mengjiang issued Mengjiang yuan from 1937 which was pegged to the Japanese military yen and Japanese yen at par.

Collaborationist governments 
The Japanese managed to establish two collaborationist regimes during their occupation in China. In the north, the "Provisional Government of China" based in Beijing established the Federal Reserve Bank of China (pinyin: Zhōngguó Liánhé Zhǔnbèi Yínháng). The FRB issued notes in 1938 at par with Kuomintang fabi. Although initially equivalent, the Japanese banned the use of Nationalist currency in 1939 and set arbitrary exchange rates in favour of the FRB yuan. The FRB yuan was replaced by Kuomintang fabi in 1945 at 5 FRB yuan = 1 fabi.

The Wang Jingwei government in Nanjing established the collaborationist Nanjing Reformed Government in 1938. This was later reorganized into the Nanjing National Government in 1940. They established the Central Reserve Bank of China (pinyin: Zhōngyāng Chǔbèi Yínháng) which began issuing CRB yuan in 1941. Although initially set at par with the Nationalist fabi, it also was arbitrarily changed to equal 0.18 Japanese military yen. In 1945, it was also replaced by the Nationalist fabi at 200 CRB yuan = 1 fabi.

Japanese military yen 
The Japanese military yen was distributed in many regions throughout East Asia under Japanese occupation. Initially, these were issued as payment to soldiers. The intention was the payout of an indefinite amount of Japanese military yen which could not be converted into Japanese yen and therefore could not cause inflation in Japan. However, the destructive effects on local East Asian economies was not a major concern.

The currency became legal tender in China commencing in 1937. It was later replaced by issues from puppet banks. However, the currency remained in force in Hong Kong between 1941 and 1945. Initially set at HK$2 = JMY1, the Hong Kong dollar was largely preferred by locals and hoarded away. In order to address this, the Japanese government made possession of Hong Kong dollars illegal in 1943 and required a conversion to JMY at 4 to 1.

People's Republic of China

Renminbi 

The Chinese Communist Party gained control of large areas of the northeast of China during 1948 and 1949. Although several regional banks were established, they were united in December 1948 as the People's Bank of China. Established in Shijiazhuang, the new bank took over currency issuance in areas controlled by the Communist Party.

After the promulgation of the People's Republic of China, there was a brief period where 100,000 gold yuan could be exchanged for 1 yuan Renminbi.

Renminbi notes were issued in 12 denominations: 1, 5, 10, 20, 50, 100, 200, 500, 1000, 5000, 10,000, and 50,000 yuan. These denominations were subdivided into 62 styles. After adjusting the currency value with ratio 1:10,000 in March 1955, the second edition of Renminbi were issued in 12 denominations, including 1 fen, 2 fen, 5 fen, 1 jiao, 2 jiao, 5 jiao, 1 yuan, 2 yuan, 3 yuan, 5 yuan and 10 yuan.

The People's Republic of China began issuing aluminum coins in December 1957, in denominations of 1, 2 and 5 fen. From 1961, China outsourced the printing of 3, 5 and 10 yuan notes to the Soviet Union.

The fifth and latest editions of the currency of the People's Republic of China have been produced since 1 October 1999. Notes have been produced in 8 denominations: old types of 1 fen, 2 fen and 5 fen, as well as new issues depicting Mao Zedong: 5 yuan, 10 yuan, 20 yuan, 50 yuan and 100 yuan. In 2004, a 1 yuan note depicting Mao Zedong first came into production. Since 1999, coins have been produced in denominations of 1 fen, 2 fen, 5 fen, 1 jiao, 5 jiao and 1 yuan.

Foreign Exchange Certificates 
The Bank of China on the Mainland was chartered as the main foreign trade and exchange bank. Foreign visitors to the People's Republic of China were required to conduct transactions with Foreign Exchange Certificates issued by the Bank of China between 1979 and 1994. These have been abolished, and all transactions now occur in Renminbi.

See also 

 Chinese Silver Panda
 Economic history of China
 List of Chinese cash coins by inscription

References

Citations

Sources 

 Hartill, David. CAST CHINESE COINS. Trafford Publishing 2005.
 Chang, H.: The Silver Dollars and Taels of China. Hong Kong, 1981 (158 pp. illus.). Including Subsidiary Notes on “The Silver Dollars and Taels of China” Hong Kong, 1982 (40 pp. illus.). 
 Cribb, Joe: A Catalogue of Sycee in the British Museum. Chinese Silver Currency Ingots c. 1750 – 1933. British Museum Press, London, 1992. 
  Dong Wenchao: An Overview of China's Gold & Silver Coins of Past Ages – the Gold and Silver Coins and Medals of Modern China. Beijing 1992, 
 Kann, Edward: Illustrated Catalog of Chinese Coins. Second edition. Mint Productions, Inc., New York, 1966 (476 pp. and 224 plates). 
 Lu, W.H. (editor): Paper Money Catalogue of the People's Republic of China (1948–1998). Paper Money Catalogue of Macau (1907–1998). International Stamp and Coin Sdn. Bhd., Kuala Lumpur, n.d. (50 plus 32 pp., colour illus.). 
 Peng Xinwei: A Monetary History of China (Zhongguo Huobi Shi). Translated by Edward H. Kaplan. Two volumes. Western Washington University, Bellingham, 1993. 
 Shanghai Museum: Chinese Coin Gallery. Shanghai, n.d. (1990s). In Chinese and English. 
 Shanghai Museum: Chinese Numismatic Gallery. Shanghai, n.d. (1990s). In Chinese and English (44pp., colour illus.) 

 Ting Fu-Pao: A Catalog of Ancient Chinese Coins (Including Japan, Forra & Annan). Taipei, n.d. (no pagination, illus.).
 White, Byron R. and White, Marjorie: A Comprehensive Finding List of Chinese Cash 618 AD to 1912 AD. Together with Lochhart's Listing of the Chinese Dynasties. Bai Publications, USA, n.p., 1976. (no pagination).

External links 

 Historical and current banknotes of China

 
Chinese numismatics
Economic history of China